Men and Women may refer to:

 Men and Women (poetry collection), an 1855 poetry collection by Robert Browning
 Men and Women (album), a 1987 album by Simply Red
 Men and Women (1914 film), a silent short film
 Men and Women (1925 film), a silent film starring Richard Dix
 Men and Women (1964 film), a Brazilian film
 Men and Women (1999 film), an LGBT Chinese film
 Men and Women (play), an 1890 play written by David Belasco
 Men and Women (newspaper supplement), a defunct glossy supplement for the Indian paper, The Times of India

See also
 Man and Woman (disambiguation)
 Women and Men, a 1987 novel